Pinneberg is an electoral constituency (German: Wahlkreis) represented in the Bundestag. It elects one member via first-past-the-post voting. Under the current constituency numbering system, it is designated as constituency 7. It is located in southwestern Schleswig-Holstein, coterminous with the Pinneberg district.

Pinneberg was created for the inaugural 1949 federal election. Since 2021, it has been represented by Ralf Stegner of the Social Democratic Party (SPD).

Geography
Pinneberg is located in southwestern Schleswig-Holstein. As of the 2021 federal election, it is coterminous with the Pinneberg district. This includes the small Heligoland islands (1.7 km2, population 1,309) off the North Sea coast.

History
Pinneberg was created in 1949. Until 1965, it was constituency 12 in the number system; from 1965 to 1976 it was constituency 9. Since 1976, it has been constituency 7. It has been coterminous with the Pinneberg district since its creation.

Members
The constituency was held by the Social Democratic Party (SPD) during the inaugural term of the Bundestag, during which time it was represented by Anni Krahnstöver. It was won by the Christian Democratic Union (CDU) in 1953, and represented by Wilhelm Goldhagen (until 1961) and Rolf Bremer. In 1969, it was won again by the SPD, and represented in turn by Hans-Ulrich Brand and Hermann P. Reiser, who each served for a single term. Party fellow Reinhard Ueberhorst represented it from 1976 until 1983, when it was won by Ingrid Roitzsch of the CDU. She was succeeded by Gert Willner from 1994 to 1998 before the constituency was again won by the SPD. Ernst Dieter Rossmann represented it for two terms. Ole Schröder of the CDU served from 2005 to 2017, before being succeeded by party fellow Michael von Abercron in 2017. Ralf Stegner was elected for the SPD in 2021.

With the exception of the 1949 election, Pinneberg can be considered Germany's bellwether constituency, having always voted for the party that would win the chancellorship. (In 1969, 1976 and 1980 elections, CDU-CSU came first, but SPD formed the government.)

Election results

2021 election

2017 election

2013 election

2009 election

References

Federal electoral districts in Schleswig-Holstein
Pinneberg (district)
Constituencies established in 1949